Phractura fasciata is a species of catfish in the genus Phractura that is found in the Congo River. It has a size is 12.5 cm SL.

References

fasciata
Taxa named by George Albert Boulenger
Fish described in 1911
Endemic fauna of the Democratic Republic of the Congo